Bergepolis was a Greek town located in ancient Thrace, in the region between the river Nestos to the river Hebros. It was founded by colonists from Abdera. Bergepolis was an urban center dependent on Abdera. Bergepolis survived in the Roman times. 

See also
Greek colonies in Thrace

References

Greek colonies in Thrace
Populated places in ancient Thrace
Former populated places in Greece
History of Western Thrace